Boo Soon-hee (born 15 July 1967) is a South Korean sport shooter who competed in the 1988 Summer Olympics, in the 1996 Summer Olympics, and in the 2000 Summer Olympics.

Personal life
Boo was raised in Jeju Province. She married office worker Choe Jae-seok in October 1992. The couple have one son, born in 1995.

References

1967 births
Living people
South Korean female sport shooters
ISSF pistol shooters
Olympic shooters of South Korea
Shooters at the 1988 Summer Olympics
Shooters at the 1996 Summer Olympics
Shooters at the 2000 Summer Olympics
Shooters at the 1990 Asian Games
Shooters at the 1994 Asian Games
Shooters at the 1998 Asian Games
Shooters at the 2006 Asian Games
Asian Games medalists in shooting
Sportspeople from Jeju Province
Asian Games silver medalists for South Korea
Asian Games bronze medalists for South Korea
Medalists at the 1990 Asian Games
Medalists at the 1994 Asian Games
Medalists at the 1998 Asian Games
Medalists at the 2006 Asian Games
20th-century South Korean women
21st-century South Korean women